Verbena amoena is a plant species in the genus Verbena.

Range
Verbena amoena is endemic to Mexico.

References

amoena